Nirmala Convent  is a 2016 Indian Telugu-language romantic drama film directed by G. Naga Koteswara Rao, and produced by Akkineni Nagarjuna and Nimmagadda Prasad on Annapurna Studios and Matrix Team Works. The film features Roshan Meka and Shriya Sharma in their debut in lead roles while Nagarjuna appears as himself in a crucial role. It has music composed by Roshan Saluri.

Meka won Best Male Debut – Telugu at the 6th South Indian International Movie Awards, in addition to Best Debut Actor Award at the 15th Santosham Film Awards.

Plot
Samuel is the son of a peasant, David Suri whose livelihood is only from a 1-acre land. Samuel is studious and very intelligent and studies plus one in Nirmala Convent in a village Bhupati Nagaram near Samalkota in Andhra Pradesh. Shanti, his classmate, daughter of rich landlord Bhupati Raja (Aditya Menon) of the same village also studies in the same convent. Initially, their acquaintance begins with teasing & quarrel but slowly it turns into love. Upon learning this, Bhupati Raja strikes Samuel and insults his father in front of everyone. Even then to make his son's love successful, Samuel's father approaches Bhupati Raja with the marriage proposal, to which he agrees on one condition: Samuel acquire a name & money of his merit. Samuel decides to become popular, and lands in Hyderabad where he meets film star Akkineni Nagarjuna and asks him to conduct the Champion of Champions program in his village. After some drama, the star accepts his request. The rest of the story if Samuel wins this challenge and gains his love with Nagarjuna's support & cooperation. During the time of contest , upon Sam request the contest is conducted in his village.  During the time of contest Bhupati plans many things to defeat Sam in the contest . During the last question of the contest, to everybody's shock he calls Bhupati Raju for the answer to show people that he is a loser. Finally Sam Wins the contest and defeats Bhupati Raju in the challenge .

Cast

Roshan Meka as Samuel Suri
Shriya Sharma as Shanti
Akkineni Nagarjuna as himself 
Aditya Menon as Bhupati Raja
Ravi Prakash as Bhupati Raja's younger brother 
Sameer as Bhupati Raja's elder brother 
Surya as David Suri
Praveen as Bulli      
Roshan Kanakala as Bhasha
Chandrahas as Venu 
Pavan Sriram as Ravi Varma 
Riteesh as Ranga
Prasanna Kumar as Sarpanch
Chitti 
Lab Sarath as Church father 
L. B. Sriram as Veerigadu
Thagubothu Ramesh
Jogi Brothers as Betting Brothers 
Satya Krishnan as Vasundhara
Anitha Chowdary as Mary
Bhargavi as Indu
Indu Anand as Principal

Production
The film was shot in five schedules in Jaipur, Araku Valley, Medak, Nainital, and Chikmagalur. The film marks the lead debut of Roshan Meka, son actors Srikanth and Ooha, after Rudhramadevi in which he played as child artist. Shriya Sharma who has acted as child artist in few films also makes her debut as the lead actress. Roshan Saluri, son of music director Koti as the music director makes his maiden film composition. A. R. Rahman's son Master A. R. Ameen has debuted as a singer in Telugu. It even marks the acting debut of Roshan Kanakala (son of actor Rajiv Kanakala and television presenter Suma) and Chandrahas (son of television actor Prabhakar). Nagarjuna has crooned a special song in this film after 17 years. He previously sang for the movie Seetharama Raju (1999).

Soundtrack

Music composed by Roshan Saluri. Music released on ADITYA Music Company. The Audio launch held at N-Convention Centre, on 8 September 2016. Allu Aravind attended the function as chief guest, Nagarjuna Akkineni, Nimmagadda Prasad, Srikanth, Ooha, Koti, G. Naga Koteswara Rao, Roshan Saluri and several industry stalwarts have graced the occasion.

Reception
Pranitha Jonnelagadda from The Times of India, rated the film 2.5/5 and wrote, "Nirmala Convent has an interesting message and class to give but the highly enthusiastic students that we are, we wanted a lot more!" A reviewer from The Hindu also felt the same, stating, "The film falls short of being a memorable outing." Rating the film 2.5 of five stars, The Indian Express' Krishna Vamsi stated, "Roshan Meka and Shriya Sharma's pair gives film some freshness, but the film fails to offer anything new in terms of script." In an other mixed review, a critic from Sakshi appreciated the performances while criticising Koteswara Rao's screenplay and direction.

References

2010s Telugu-language films
Indian coming-of-age films
Indian teen romance films
2016 directorial debut films
2016 romantic drama films